Hexi Caihua, Hexi painting, or Imperial-style decorative painting, is the royal variation of Caihua, a traditional Chinese decorative painting applied to the surface of the buildings.

References

Sources
 Taihe Dian: The Hall of Supreme Harmony of the Forbidden City in Beijing

Chinese art
Architectural styles
Chinese painting
Architecture in China
Chinese architectural history